Monster High is an animated web series based on the eponymous then-freshman American fashion doll line created by Mattel, the first adaptation since its launch, which originally aired on YouTube from May 5, 2010, to February 9, 2018.

The series follows a group of teenage children of famous monsters in media and film as they attend high school. Along with its feature-length direct-to-video films, this series serves as a platform to launch new doll characters. The web series finished its first run in 2015 with Volume 6, and got rebooted with a long-form 11-minute, 12-episode series order titled the Adventures of the Ghoul Squad. As at July 12, 2018, 189 web series episodes were produced and released – including the reboot series.

Development 
The original Monster High dolls were created by Garrett Sander, with illustrations by Kellee Riley and illustrator Glen Hanson. The characters are inspired by monster movies, sci-fi horror, thriller fiction and various other creatures.

The 2D animation was produced by WildBrain Entertainment during since the web series launch until 2013 and 6 Point Harness thereafter, though Top Drawn Animation has been continuously hired by both companies for supportive work after it took over from Caboom. Audio dialogue recordings and music for the web series was done by Salami Studios.

Release 
The web series premiered on YouTube on 5 May 2010 and ended in 2015 to make way for the release of the origin story film special, "Welcome to Monster High" The web series got rebooted in 2016 with a 12-episode order called the Adventures of the Ghoul Squad and aired on YouTube and its sibling outlet, YouTube Kids between 11 August 2017 and 9 February 2018. Episodes were added weekly on Fridays.

Series overview

Episodes

Volume 1 (2010–11)

Volume 2 (2011)

Volume 3 (2011–13)

DVD Bonus Episodes

Volume 4 (2013–15)
Volume 4 went on hiatus after the fifth episode, "Scream Spirit", due to episodes of Volume 3 & 4 airing in the wrong order.  The series restarted on February 20, 2014, with new episodes, closer the release of the movie Frights, Camera, Action.

Volume 5 (2014–15)
On October 2, a Volume 5 webisode was uploaded onto YouTube. Much like Volume 4, Volume 5 seems to have started before the previous volume has come to its end. Notable changes in Volume 5 so far are an increased running time, and a slight improvement in the animation itself, such as more varied facial expressions, and the exterior of Monster High's main building changing to look more like the school as seen in the movie specials.

Volume 6 (2015)
On June 19, 2015, Volume 6 webisodes started to be uploaded onto YouTube. Volume 6 seems to carry on the new changes made in Volume 5, including multiple-part webisodes. Volume 6 is also the final season volume for the Monster High web series.

Promotional webisodes

Adventures of the Ghoul Squad  (2017–2018)   
On August 11, 2017, Mattel Creations released an 11-minute 12-episode series on YouTube and YouTube Kids titled Monster High: Adventures of the Ghoul Squad which followed the second-generation reboot films. The series also debuted on KidsClick in the United States along with Barbie: Dreamtopia, on September 24, 2018.

References

External links
 

Monster High
2010 web series debuts
2010s American animated television series
2010s American high school television series
2010 American television series debuts
2018 American television series endings
YouTube original programming
Television series by DHX Media
Television series by Mattel Creations
Television series by Universal Television
American animated web series
American children's animated science fantasy television series
Animated science fiction web series
American children's web series